Sir (Reginald) James Bowker  (2 July 1901 – 15 December 1983) was a British diplomat who was ambassador to Burma, Turkey and Austria.

Career
Bowker was educated at Charterhouse School and Oriel College, Oxford. He joined the Diplomatic Services in 1925 and served in Paris, Berlin, Ankara, Oslo and Madrid before being appointed Minister in Cairo 1945–47 (second to the Ambassador, and chargé d'affaires between ambassadors); High Commissioner and, after independence in 1948, Ambassador to Burma 1947–50; an assistant Under-Secretary (head of department) for the Middle East and North Africa at the Foreign Office 1950–53; and Ambassador to Turkey 1954–58.

When Bowker left Turkey, The Times correspondent there commented that during his term  

Bowker's last post was Ambassador to Austria, 1958–61.

Honours
Bowker was appointed  in 1945, knighted KCMG in the 1952 New Year Honours, and awarded the additional, senior knighthood of GBE when he retired in 1961.

Elsa Bowker
In 1947 Bowker married Elsa Gued, whom he had met in Cairo while he was posted there. Lady Bowker (as she became) was a noted socialite. She continued to live in London after Sir James' death, and in 1992 she met, and became a confidante of, Diana, Princess of Wales. Lady Bowker died in 2000. She had no children.

References
BOWKER, Sir (Reginald) James, Who Was Who, A & C Black, 1920–2015 (online edition, Oxford University Press, 2014)

External links

1901 births
1983 deaths
People educated at Charterhouse School
Alumni of Oriel College, Oxford
Ambassadors of the United Kingdom to Myanmar
Ambassadors of the United Kingdom to Turkey
Ambassadors of the United Kingdom to Austria
Knights Grand Cross of the Order of the British Empire
Knights Commander of the Order of St Michael and St George